Highlandtown is a neighborhood of Baltimore, Maryland, United States.

Description and history
The area currently known as Highlandtown was established in 1866 when the area known as "Snake Hill" was established as a village outside the Baltimore city limits. The first settlers of the community were primarily German 
Americans. In 1870, residents renamed the neighborhood "Highland Town" because of the views it offered over the city. The neighborhood was made part of Baltimore City in 1919.

The neighborhood today is bounded by Haven Street to the east, Baltimore Street to the north, Linwood Avenue to the west, and Eastern Avenue to the south. The long stretch of Eastern Avenue that runs through the neighborhood is notable as the Highlandtown's main commercial thoroughfare. The area was designated as a "Main Street District" by a previous mayor Martin O'Malley, seeking to promote commercial revitalization through economic incentives from the National Main Street Program.

Highlandtown is one of Baltimore's traditional blue-collar neighborhoods, and for this reason was designated as part of the Patterson Park/Highlandtown Historic District in the National Register of Historic Places. In Baltimorese the neighborhood is pronounced "Hollantown". Historically one of the city's main commercial and industrial hubs, the neighborhood suffered a period of decline beginning in the 1970s as the manufacturing sector declined and department stores were replaced by shopping malls.

Highlandtown was once known as a "Little Appalachia" or a "hillbilly ghetto." Before, during, and after World War II many Appalachian migrants settled in Baltimore, including in Highlandtown. Appalachian people who migrated to Highlandtown were largely economic migrants who came looking for work.

Modern Highlandtown is in transition. The German, Polish, Czech, Italian, Irish, Greek, and Ukrainian population are being augmented with a growing Latino community. The headquarters of the Baltimore Science Fiction Society can be found on the northern edge of Highlandtown.

Former United States Senator Barbara Mikulski grew up in Highlandtown.

The easternmost eight blocks are occupied by parallel-running north–south streets that start with consecutive letters of the alphabet, from B to H: Baylis, Conkling, Dean, Eaton, Fagley, Grundy and Haven. This scheme continues in Greektown to the east, and resets at Bayview.

Demographics
As of the census of 2010, there were 7,820 people living in the neighborhood. The racial makeup of Highlandtown was 42.3% white, 34% Hispanic, 19.7% African American, and 5% all other (Asians, Native Americans etc.). Most of the Hispanic population consist of Mexicans, Puerto Ricans, Salvadorans, Dominicans, Hondurans, Nicaraguans, Cubans, and Colombians, among others. 59.8% of occupied housing units were owner-occupied. 15.5% of housing units were vacant.

52.0% of the population were employed, 5.0% were unemployed, and 42.7% were not in the labor force. The median household income was $28,813. About 14.8% of families and 22.6% of the population were below the poverty line.

See also
Highlandtown Arts District

References

External sources

 Healthy Neighborhoods: Southeast Baltimore
 Highlandtown Community Association
 Southeast Community Development Corporation
 Greetings from Highlandtown
 Highlandtown Arts
 National Main Street Program
 Demographics from Neighborhood Indicators Alliance
, including undated photo and boundary map, at Maryland Historical Trust
Patterson Park/Highlandtown listing at CHAP includes map

 
1866 establishments in Maryland
Appalachian culture in Baltimore
Greek-American culture in Baltimore
Hispanic and Latino American culture in Baltimore
Houses in Baltimore
Houses on the National Register of Historic Places in Maryland
Irish-American culture in Baltimore
Irish-American neighborhoods
Neighborhoods in Baltimore
Polish-American culture in Baltimore
Polish communities in the United States
Ukrainian-American culture in Baltimore
Victorian architecture in Maryland
Historic districts on the National Register of Historic Places in Baltimore
Southeast Baltimore